Pempeliella malacella is a species of snout moth. It is found in Spain, North Africa (including Tunisia) and the United Arab Emirates.

References

Moths described in 1870
Phycitini